The National Assembly was the unicameral parliament of Communist Czechoslovakia from 1948 until the federalization of Czechoslovakia in 1969, replaced by the Federal Assembly. It was Czechoslovakia's highest legislative institution.

Name Changes

Presidents of the National Assembly

References

External links
 Joint Czech-Slovak Digital Parliamentary Library

Parliaments of Czechoslovakia
1948 establishments in Czechoslovakia
1969 disestablishments in Czechoslovakia
Defunct unicameral legislatures